Robert G. Hiddlestone was an association football goalkeeper who represented New Zealand at international level.

Hiddlestone played a total 12 times for New Zealand including three official A-international matches in 1954, all against trans-Tasman neighbours Australia, the first a 2-1 win on 14 August, followed by consecutive 1-4 losses  on 28 August and 4 September respectively.

References 

Year of birth missing
Year of death missing
New Zealand association footballers
New Zealand international footballers
Association football goalkeepers